Haunted Woman is the debut studio album by Canadian country music group Ladies of the Canyon. It was released on June 1, 2010 by Kindling/Warner Music Canada. The first single was "Follow Me Down."

Track listing

External links
[ Haunted Woman] at Allmusic

2010 debut albums
Ladies of the Canyon albums